Joe Griffin (born 17 November 1947) is an Irish social psychologist, educator and writer. He is an Associate Fellow of the British Psychological Society and holds Graduate and Post Graduate degrees from the London School of Economics. Among other things he is credited with proposing why we evolved to dream and uncovering the connection between dreaming and depression. He lives with his wife Liz in County Kildare, Ireland.

He has made a study of caetextia (context blindness) and the chaos created when individuals or committees impose administrative systems on organisations without appreciating the impact their decisions can have on the smooth running of them and the way events are likely to pan out. 

He has broadcast on radio and TV in Ireland and the UK and was interviewed in New Scientist about his discoveries of the link between depression and dreaming. 

Joe is the co-developer with Ivan Tyrrell of the 'human givens' approach to psychology and behaviour that is of practical benefit to individuals and organisations.

He has many years training experience and over the last two decades, thousands of health professionals have attended his practical workshops and seminars on effective psychotherapy for treating anxiety related disorders, depression, trauma and addiction.

Joe is co-author, with Ivan Tyrrell, of numerous books and publications. These include: Human Givens: A new approach to emotional health and clear thinking, and Why we dream: The definitive answer. His work has been favourably reviewed in the Financial Times, New Scientist and Daily Telegraph.

Publications 
 The Origin of Dreams (1997) The Therapist Ltd., 
 Hypnosis and Trance States: The first explanation of hypnosis from an evolutionary perspective. (1998) Co-author: Tyrrell, I. Organising Idea Monograph, No.1. European Therapy Studies Institute. .
 Psychotherapy and the Human Givens. (1998) Co-author: Tyrrell, I.  Organising Idea Monograph, No.2. European Therapy Studies Institute. .
 Breaking the Cycle of Depression: The connection between depression and dreaming and what it means for psychotherapy. (1999) Co-author: Tyrrell, I. Organising Idea Monograph, No.3. European Therapy Studies Institute.
 The APET model: patterns in the brain. (2000) Co-author: Tyrrell, I. Organising Idea Monograph, No.4. European Therapy Studies Institute. .
 The Shackled Brain: How to release locked in patterns of psychological trauma. (2000) Co-author: Tyrrell, I. Organising Idea Monograph, No.5. European Therapy Studies Institute. .
 Griffin, J. & Tyrrell, I. (2004). Dreaming Reality: How dreaming keeps us sane, or can drive us mad. Human Givens Publishing. 
 Griffin, J. & Tyrrell, I. (2004). How to lift depression fast. Human Givens Publishing. 
 Griffin, J. & Tyrrell, I. (2005). Freedom from addiction: The secret behind successful addiction busting. Human Givens Publishing. 
 Griffin, J. & Tyrrell, I. (2007). An Idea in Practice: using the human givens approach. Human Givens Publishing. .
 Griffin, J. & Tyrrell, I. (2007). How to master anxiety: Stress, panic attacks, phobias, psychological trauma and more. Human Givens Publishing. 
 Griffin, J. & Tyrrell, I. (2008). Release from anger: Practical help for controlling unreasonable rage. Human Givens Publishing. 
 Griffin, J. & Tyrrell, I. (2013). Why We Dream: The Definitive Answer. Human Givens Publishing.  .
 Griffin, J. & Tyrrell, I. (2013). Human Givens: The New Approach to Emotional Health and Clear Thinking. Human Givens Publishing.

Books 
 The Human Givens: A new approach to emotional health and clear thinking. (2003) Co-author: Tyrrell, I. HG Publishing, .
 Dreaming Reality: How dreaming keeps us sane, or can drive us mad. (2004) Co-author: Tyrrell, I. HG Publishing, .
 How to lift depression...fast. (2004) Co-author: Tyrrell, I. HG Publishing, .
 Freedom from addiction: The secret behind successful addiction busting. (2005) Co-author: Tyrrell, I. HG Publishing, 
 Godhead, The Brain's Big Bang: The explosive origin of creativity, mysticism and mental illness. (2011) Co-author: Tyrrell, I. HG Publishing,

References

External links
 The Human Givens Institute
 Griffin & Tyrrell

Living people
1947 births
Irish psychologists
Social psychologists
Alumni of the London School of Economics